MF or mf may refer to:

Biology
 Mossy fiber (disambiguation), in neuroscience
 Mycosis fungoides, a type of skin disease
 Myelofibrosis, a chronic clonal malignant disease
 Microfibril rosettes, the sites of cellulose microfibril synthesis in plants

Companies and organizations
 MF Dow Jones News, an Italian financial news agency
 MF Milano Finanza, an Italian business newspaper
 MF Global (also Man Financial), a former finance company NYSE listed as MF
 MF Norwegian School of Theology
 Massey Ferguson, an agricultural equipment company
 Methuselah Foundation, a non-profit volunteer organization devoted to anti-aging research
 Micro Focus, a software company
 Mitsubishi Fuso Truck and Bus Corporation, a Japanese manufacturer of trucks and buses
 Mitsubishi Fuso Truck of America, Inc., a North American subsidiary
 Mladá fronta DNES, a Czech newspaper
 Musical Fidelity, a British high-end audio equipment manufacturer
 Xiamen Airlines (IATA airline designator MF)
 Muslims of France, a religious organization in France

Computing
 MF and .mf, the country code and Internet top level domain for Saint Martin
 Mainframe computer
 MediaFire, a file hosting, file synchronization, and cloud storage service 
 Metafont, a font-definition programming language
 Mozilla Firefox, a web browser
 Multi-frequency, in telephony

Entertainment

Music
 Mezzo forte (musical notation), a dynamic marking
 Maynard Ferguson (1928–2006), trumpeter and bandleader
 Melodifestivalen, the Swedish preselection for the Eurovision Song Contest
 MF Doom (Daniel Dumile, born 1974), British-born hip hop recording artist
 MF Grimm (born 1970), hip-hop artist
 Mylène Farmer (born 1961), Canadian-born French singer and songwriter

Television
 Making Fiends (TV series), an American animated horror comedy
 Modern Family, an American sitcom
 Monster Force, a 1994 animated television series

Video games
 Metroid Fusion

Other uses
 M/F, a novel by Anthony Burgess
M/F (journal), British feminist journal
MF or M/F, ship prefix for a motor ferry
 Megafarad (MF), an SI unit of electric capacitance
 Millifarad (mF), an SI unit of electric capacitance
 The prefix for steel-wheel rolling stock on the Paris Métro
 Mandatory frequency airport, a non-towered airport that requires aircraft to communicate on a published frequency
 Manual focus
 Master of forestry
 Mayotte, France (FIPS PUB 10-4 territory code MF)
 Medium format (film), a size of camera
 Medium frequency, radio transmissions between the frequencies of 300 kHz and 3000 kHz
 Membership function, in control engineering, in fuzzy sets
 Midfielder, a playing position in association football
 Milk fat, on dairy product labels in Canada
 Motherfucker, an insult
 Mutual fund, in finance
Member of the Folketing

See also
 Miss Fortune (disambiguation)
 My Friend (disambiguation)